"Dixie Dreaming" is a song written by John Gilbert and recorded by American country music group Atlanta. It was released in September 1983 through MDJ Records and later appeared on the band's MCA Records album Pictures. The song reached number 11 on the U.S. Billboard Hot Country Singles chart.

Chart performance

References

1983 singles
Atlanta (band) songs
1983 songs